Fear Factor: Khatron Ke Khiladi Bach Ke Kahan Jayega? Khatra Kahin Se Bhi Aayega! is the twelfth season of Fear Factor: Khatron Ke Khiladi, an Indian reality and stunt television series produced by Endemol Shine India. The show premiered from 2 July 2022 to 25 September 2022, on Colors TV and digitally streams on Voot. Filmed in Cape Town, South Africa, the show was hosted by Rohit Shetty. Spanning over 26 episodes, this season became the longest season since the inception of the series. Tushar Kalia emerged as the winner of this season while Faisal Shaikh became the 1st runner-up.

Contestants

Elimination chart 

 
 Nishant and Rubina were nominated by co-contestants for the elimination stunt.
 Contestants were tortured via Pre-Stunts before Stunts.
 Faisal did not perform the Pre-Stunt as a result he had to directly perform elimination stunt.
  Pairs during Partner Week.
 Pairs who lost the first stunt competed against each other to get rid of Fear Funda.
 Pratik was not chosen as a teammate by any of the two teams so as a result he had to directly perform elimination stunt.
 Teams continued from Week 5.
 All contestants performed the Captaincy stunt together.
 Captain of respective team:  Team Red  Team Yellow
 Captains were exempted from performing the Elimination stunt.
 Winners of the first stunt of K Medal Race were given the exclusive power to remove losers of the first stunt from the race.
 Faisal proxies Rajiv due to injury.
 Kanika used K Medal to swap Mohit with Jannat in Elimination stunt.
 All contestants received Fear Funda performed stunts together.
 Mohit proxies Jannat due to health issues.

  Winner
  1st runner-up
  2nd runner-up
 Finalists
 Ticket to Finale
 Won/Used K Medal
 The contestant won the stunt. 
 The contestant lost the stunt and received Fear Funda.
 The contestant got rid of Fear Funda by winning pre-elimination stunt.
 The contestant was placed in the bottom and performed elimination stunt
 The contestant was safe from elimination by winning elimination stunt.
 The contestant was eliminated
 The contestant was exempted from performing the stunt.
 The contestant lost the Ticket to Finale Race/K Medal Race/failed to complete the target.
 The contestant was removed from the Ticket to Finale/K Medal Race.
 Injury
 N/A

Production

Broadcast
Apart from the usual weekend episodes, Voot for the first time launched web exclusive's like "Pack-up Ka Punch", "Khiladiyon Ki Journey", "Khiladiyon Ki Fitness Diary", "Khiladiyon Ki Fashion Diary" and "Cape Town Diaries" tracing the contestants' off-screen journey.

Casting
In May 2022, it was reported that Munawar Faruqui would join the show midway but later backed out due to passport issue.

Development
The series was announced by Colors TV with a press conference on 25 May 2022. The contestants were spotted at the Chhatrapati Shivaji Maharaj International Airport before leaving for Cape Town, South Africa on 28 May 2022. The contestants were spotted at the Mumbai Airport after returning from Cape Town, South Africa on 18 July 2022.

Filming 
The principal photography of the series began on 6 June 2022 in Cape Town, South Africa. Rohit Shetty took to his Instagram to officially announce the same. Rohit Shetty announced the wrap up of "Khatron Ke Khiladi 12" in Cape Town through an Instagram post on 16 July 2022 in 50 days schedule. The Grand Finale shooting was held on 18 September 2022 in Film City, Mumbai.

Release 
On 6 June 2022, a promo revealing the season's logo and sponsors was released on Colors TV official Instagram and Twitter handles. Subsequently, intro promos of Rubina, Sriti, Tushar, Mohit, Kanika, Shivangi, Jannat and Faisal were released respectively.

Controversies
This season was marked by a series of controversies, including:
Rubina Dilaik accused Kanika Mann of having searched the internet for the phrases "how to tame an ostrich" and " how to use the feathers of an ostrich" prior to the stunt, and alleged that this had been cheating. Rohit Shetty supported Rubina in this.
 The show landed into controversy when Mohit Malik, Rajiv Adatia and Faisal Shaikh accused that the stunt Rubina Dilaik got was easier than that of Jannat Zubair Rahmani and that is why Rubina deserves to go in elimination. Rohit Shetty defended Rubina by saying that the level of stunts cannot be a determining factor for who should go for the elimination stunt.
Mohit Malik and Rubina Dilaik had an argument when Rubina revealed her fear of snakes. This agitated Mohit and asked her why she did not reveal it earlier and accused that this was a desperate attempt of trying to be seen, leading Rubina to leave the team.
Rubina Dilaik and Mohit Malik again get into a tiff when Mohit chooses Rubina for the elimination stunt. Rubina accuses Mohit of choosing her because she didn't chill with anyone post packup. She further said, "no matter how good or bad I perform, I am always chosen for the elimination tasks based on people's disliking towards me." During Mohit and Rubina's fight, Tushar Kalia intervened and said "your team got saved because she won the animal task, Rubina isn't the right choice for the elimination task."
Kanika Mann and Rubina Dilaik had a verbal spat when Kanika won the K Medal and Rubina accused Kanika of lying about not knowing how to drive. Rubina remarked- "Losing with honestly is much better than winning with dishonesty" which irked the former.
Kanika Mann and Jannat Zubair had a verbal argument when Kanika chooses Jannat for the elimination stunt using K Medal. The latter says, "It is not about the performance but the equation we share. I have performed well in the task. Your thought of keeping a female against female in the task, that's wrong."
Rohit Shetty thrashed Kanika Mann when she aborted the stunt in semi-finale week and said that Shivangi Joshi was better than her and she deserved to be in her place. He further added that Kanika neither deserves to be a finalist nor the trophy.

Stunt Matrix

Episodes

Guest appearances

Reception
The season opened with a TRP rating of 2.5 but soon the ratings fell.

Ratings

See also  
List of programmes broadcast by Colors TV

References

External links 

 Khatron Ke Khiladi 12 at Colors TV
 Khatron Ke Khiladi 12 on Voot

2022 Indian television seasons
12
Colors TV original programming